Qaleh Juq (also Romanized as Qal‘eh Jūq) is a village in Gejlarat-e Sharqi Rural District, Aras District, Poldasht County, West Azerbaijan Province, Iran. At the 2006 census, its population was 114, in 24 families.

References 

Populated places in Poldasht County